Gaston Bélier (1863 – 1938) was a French organist and composer.

Career 
From 1927 he was involved in the renovation and extension of the organ of La Madeleine in the 8th arrondissement. In 1930 he participated in 's reconstruction of the organ of the Carmelite monastery of St. Joseph of Pontoise.

Composition 
Like his colleagues Albert Renaud and Marcel Lanquetuit, Bélier is mostly known today for his Toccata pour grand orgue in D minor published by M. Senart in Paris in 1912. He also composed a Elevation for Organ, available on IMSLP.

Discography 
Philippe Bardon (on the organ of Saint-Maclou): Un récital d'orgue à Pontoise (EMA 9509), with works by J. S. Bach, Nicolas de Grigny, Michel Corrette, W. A. Mozart, Felix Mendelssohn, César Franck, Gaston Bélier, Jehan Alain and Olivier Messiaen.

References

External links 
 YouTube Marko Hakanpää plays Bélier's Toccata at the Grönlunds organ (III/52, 2002) of the Saint-Michel church at Turku, Finland (audio only).
 YouTube Diane Bish plays Bélier's Toccata at the Rieger organ (III/58, 1992) of the St. Giles Cathedral in Edinburgh, Scotland.
 France Orgue G. Bélier's discography by Alain Carteyrade.
  La Toccata pour orgue en ré mineur. (revised version, 17 March 2012.)

1863 births
1938 deaths
Place of birth missing
Conservatoire de Paris alumni
French classical organists
French male organists
19th-century organists
20th-century organists
20th-century French male musicians
19th-century French male musicians
Male classical organists